Margarete von Leiningen-Westerburg-Neuleiningen (1694-1771), was a countess regnant of Leiningen from 1726.

References

18th-century women rulers
18th-century German women
1694 births
1771 deaths
Place of birth missing